The Tajik Mafia (Russian: Таджикская мафия; Tajik (persian script): تاجک مافيا) are an organized crime syndicate which runs operations and encompasses an area from the Tajikistan capital Dushanbe to the northern Afghanistan provinces of Badakhshan, Panjshir, Balkh, and Jawzjan. They also run operations in the Russian capital of Moscow since the 1990s and are prevalent in the city and country as one of the biggest running mafias.

Geography of Tajikistan